Kroelinger Airport  is a privately owned, public-use airport in Cumberland County, New Jersey, United States. It is located three nautical miles (3.5 mi, 5.6 km) north of the central business district of Vineland.

Facilities and aircraft 
It has one runway designated 10/28 with a turf surface measuring 2,086 by 190 feet (636 x 58 m).

For the 12-month period ending July 31, 2010, the airport had 170 general aviation aircraft operations, an average of 14 per month. At that time there were 3 aircraft based at this airport: 100% single-engine.

References

External links 
 Aerial photo as of 8 March 1991 from USGS The National Map
 

Airports in New Jersey
Transportation buildings and structures in Cumberland County, New Jersey